Polyrhachis punctillata is a species of ant in the subfamily Formicinae, found in few Asian countries. Three subspecies are recognized.

Subspecies
Polyrhachis punctillata fergusoni Forel, 1902 – India
Polyrhachis punctillata punctillata Roger, 1863 – Sri Lanka, China
Polyrhachis punctillata smythiesii Forel, 1895 – India

References

External links

 at antwiki.org
Animaldiversity.org

Formicinae
Hymenoptera of Asia
Insects described in 1863